Hervé Gauvain (born 4 March 1955) is a French former professional tennis player.

A right-handed player from Châlon sur Saone, Gauvain featured on the professional tour in the 1970s and early 1980s. His best performance was a semi-final appearance at Nuremberg in 1976 and he also reached the quarter-finals at Helsinki in 1977. He played in the main draw of the French Open on six occasions, without making it past the first round.

His wife Florence was a professional tennis player. Their daughter, Sybille, played college tennis for San Jose State University and now competes professionally.

References

External links
 
 

1955 births
Living people
French male tennis players
People from Châlons-en-Champagne
Sportspeople from Marne (department)